William Weeks (October 20, 1929 – May 2, 2006) was an American football player and coach.  He served as the head football coach at the University of New Mexico from 1960 to 1967, compiling a record of 40–41–1.  Weeks was an All-Big Seven Conference quarterback at Iowa State University in 1949 and 1950.  He played in the East–West Shrine Game and the Hula Bowl following the 1950 season. He was drafted by the Philadelphia Eagles in the eighteenth round of the 1951 NFL Draft. Weeks died at the age of 76 on May 2, 2006 in Albuquerque, New Mexico.

Head coaching record

College

References

1929 births
2006 deaths
American football quarterbacks
Iowa State Cyclones football players
New Mexico Lobos football coaches
High school football coaches in Iowa
People from Franklin County, Iowa
Coaches of American football from Iowa
Players of American football from Iowa